Ravensburger AG is a German game and toy company, publishing house and market leader in the European jigsaw puzzle market.

History
The company was founded by Otto Robert Maier  in Ravensburg, a town in Upper Swabia in southern Germany. He began publishing in 1883 with his first author contract. He started publishing instruction folders for craftsmen and architects, which soon acquired him a solid financial basis. His first board game appeared in 1884, named Journey Around the World.

At the turn of the 20th century, his product line broadened to include picture books, books, children’s activity books, art instruction manuals, non-fiction books, and reference books as well as children’s games, Happy Families, and activity kits. In 1900, the Ravensburger blue triangle trademark was registered with the Imperial patent office. As of 1912, many board and activity games had an export version that was distributed to Western Europe, the countries of the Danube Monarchy as well as Russia.

Before the First World War, Ravensburger had around 800 products. The publishing house was damaged during the Second World War and continued to produce games in the years of the reconstruction. The company focused on children's games and books and specialized books for art, architecture, and hobbies, and from 1962 grew strongly. The company started to produce jigsaw puzzle games in 1964, and in the same year opened subsidiaries in Austria, France, Italy, the Netherlands, Switzerland and the United Kingdom. In 1977, the company split into a book publishing arm and a game publishing arm.

Today there are approximately 1800 available books and 850 games as well as puzzles, hobby products, and CD-ROM titles at Ravensburger and its subsidiaries, which include Alea for "hobby and ardent game players" and F.X. Schmid for games, playing cards and children's books. Ravensburger products are exported to more than fifty countries.

Under the label F.X. Schmid, Ravensburger produces one of the only two packs of true Tarock cards in Germany: a 54-card pack of the Bourgeois Tarot pattern with genre scenes and used for playing the game of Cego,  popular in the Black Forest region.

In September 2010, Ravensburger broke the world record for the largest jigsaw puzzle, with one designed by late pop artist Keith Haring titled "Keith Haring: Double Retrospect". Built from 32,256 pieces, it measured 17' × 6' (5.18 m x 1.82 m) and came with a hand truck for transportation. Ravensburger has since released larger puzzles, with their largest being "Memorable Disney Moments" and "Making Mickey Magic" having 40,320 pieces each, however they have also since lost the world record to a 51,300 piece puzzle released by Kodak.

Swedish toy train company BRIO was acquired by the Ravensburger Group on 8 January 2015. In 2017, Ravensburger acquired American game company Wonder Forge.

The company's North American division, Ravensburger NA, is based in Seattle, Washington and releases approximately 25 games per year, the most successfully of which so far is Villainous, based on various Disney properties. Ravensbuger NA sold about 3 million copies of games in 2018.

Media Subsidiaries

Ravensburger Interactive Media

Ravensburger Interactive Media GmbH was a video game and software subsidiary of Ravensburger which published and distributed various games in Germany. The company had two brands; Ravensburger Interactive, which published family-friendly games and educational software, and Fishtank Interactive, which published games for mature players.

In May 2002, Ravensburger Interactive was sold with Fishtank Interactive to JoWooD Productions.

Ravensburger Film + TV
Ravensburger Film + TV GmbH is a former motion picture and television subsidiary of Ravensburger.

In late 1998, Ravensburger sold off the unit, with the new owners rebranding the company as RTV Family Entertainment AG. Ravensburger remained as a shareholder and continued to allow RTV to license their branding. The company launched a Ravensburger TV block on Super RTL in 2001.

In 2005, Ravensburger sold all their shares in the business, and in mid-2006, the company rebranded as Your Family Entertainment AG.

Notable games
Games sold under the "Ravensburger" imprint:
 Dingbats
 Emoji
 Enchanted Forest
 Havannah 
 Java
 Journey through Europe
 Know Interactive Board Game
 Labyrinth (board game)
Lotus
 Make 'n' Break
 Malefiz
 Mexica
 The Name of the Rose (2008)
 Nobody is Perfect
 Quest
 Reversi
 Rivers, Roads & Rails
 Scotland Yard
 Star Wars
 Tactil
 Take It Easy
 Tikal
 Top Secret Spies
 Villainous
 What Do You Hear?
Games sold under the "Alea" label:
 Broom Service
 Castles of Burgundy
 Chinatown
 Las Vegas
 Princes of Florence
 Puerto Rico
 Ra
 San Juan
Games sold under the F.X. Schmid label:
 Auf Achse
 Torres
 Black Forest Cego playing cards
Games sold under the "Ravensburger Digital" label:
 Concentration in various editions

References

External links

 

Board game publishing companies
Jigsaw puzzle manufacturers
Toy companies of Germany
Companies based in Baden-Württemberg
Manufacturing companies established in 1883
Playing card manufacturers
Ravensburg
Toy companies established in the 19th century
German companies established in 1883